James Robert Glass (born 1 August 1973) is an English former professional footballer who played as a goalkeeper.

He is chiefly remembered for scoring the last-minute goal which kept Carlisle United in the Football League in 1999, while on loan from Swindon Town. The drama of Glass's late goal, which came in one of only three games that he played for Carlisle, has since made it famous in English football at a level beyond its immediate ramifications.

Beyond the Carlisle goal, Glass's most notable time with a club was three seasons playing for AFC Bournemouth from 1996 to 1998, his only regular spell at a Football League club; he retired from football in 2001 aged 27.

Career

Early career 
Glass had a journeyman's career in football, playing for many clubs, initially as a reserve keeper for Crystal Palace. He never played a first team game for the Eagles, but was an unused substitute several times, including the 1995 FA Cup semi-final replay against Manchester United, which Palace lost 2–0 at Villa Park. He was transferred to AFC Bournemouth a year later.

The closest he came to a trophy in senior football was reaching the final of the Football League Trophy with Bournemouth in 1998 – Glass scored an own goal in the match, and Bournemouth lost 2–1. It was the last own goal scored at the old Wembley. Glass moved to Swindon Town in the summer of 1998, but after falling out with the manager, Jimmy Quinn, was unable to gain a regular place in the team.

Carlisle United 
He moved to Carlisle United on loan from Swindon late that season (after goalkeeper Tony Caig was sold to Blackpool and Richard Knight's loan period had been cut short due to injury). His moment of fame came on 8 May 1999, in the final match of the 1998–99 Third Division season against Plymouth Argyle, which Carlisle needed to win to avoid relegation. With the score 1–1 with only ten seconds remaining, and Carlisle winning a corner, Glass came up from his own penalty area and promptly scored a last minute goal, volleying the ball in after the Plymouth goalkeeper had parried out Scott Dobie's goalbound header. Carlisle got the win they needed and Scarborough were relegated to the Football Conference instead after a 1–1 draw with Peterborough United. Scarborough's match had already finished before Glass scored, and their fans had already been celebrating on the pitch at the McCain Stadium.

His goal was selected as the 72nd greatest sporting moment ever by the Channel 4 programme 100 Greatest Sporting Moments. The goal was also ranked 7th in The Times newspaper's list of the 50 most important goals in football history. His goal against Plymouth Argyle was number 15 in the 20 Goals That Shook the World on ITV4. The Puma boots with which he scored the goal were donated to the National Football Museum in 2014.

After Carlisle United 
Despite his brief fame, this was the last of just three matches Glass played at Carlisle, who were unable to sign him on a permanent basis. Glass spent time at several other clubs, including Oxford United and Brentford, before moving to non-league clubs, and then quitting football altogether. He reportedly scored six goals two weeks running whilst playing Sunday league football in Bournemouth, playing as a striker. He wrote an autobiography, entitled One Hit Wonder.

Author Gabriel Kuhn described Glass's fame by saying:

After football 
Glass retired from professional football at the age of 27, and became an IT salesman. He later became a taxi driver in Dorset.

In a 2013 BBC interview Glass stated: "It is quite tough because some go on to fame and fortune and some go on to driving a cab and living a normal life like me. It is quite difficult to understand your place in life from being this guy who will never be forgotten to being the guy worrying about your next bill. The goal was an amazing part of my life and is there to be enjoyed, and I will until people get bored of me. Someone on Saturday will be a hero and someone will be a villain. It is an incredible feeling."

In October 2011, it was announced that Glass joined Poole Town as the new goalkeeping coach, working on a voluntary basis. He also had a job in hospitality at AFC Bournemouth. In 2016, he returned to football as Player Liaison Officer with Premier League club Bournemouth.

See also 
 List of goalscoring goalkeepers

References

External links 
 
 The Observer – Do You Remember...Jimmy Glass?
 BBC Press Release
 Working Glass Hero – article in the University of Cumbria student newspaper

1973 births
Association football goalkeepers
Crystal Palace F.C. players
Dulwich Hamlet F.C. players
Portsmouth F.C. players
Gillingham F.C. players
Burnley F.C. players
AFC Bournemouth players
Swindon Town F.C. players
Carlisle United F.C. players
Cambridge United F.C. players
Brentford F.C. players
Oxford United F.C. players
Crawley Town F.C. players
Brockenhurst F.C. players
Kingstonian F.C. players
Lewes F.C. players
Weymouth F.C. players
English footballers
National League (English football) players
Living people
Sportspeople from Epsom
AFC Bournemouth non-playing staff
English Football League players
Association football goalkeeping coaches